Iron Palm or Iron Hand (Chinese: 鐵掌功) is a body of training techniques in various Chinese martial arts. It is originally one of the 72 arts of the Shaolin temple. These conditioning techniques are typically meant to condition the hands to allow a practitioner to deliver very powerful blows without injury to their hands.

Overview

Iron Palm is the vernacular for the results of serious training centered mainly on the palm of the hand, although other parts of the hand may also be targeted, and covers many different conditioning methods. Most Iron Palm systems are considered internal, utilizing qigong exercises to train other aspects of development in addition to the external conditioning which ultimately alters the internal structures of the hand, such as the bones and sinews. However, martial artists who practice Iron Palm are not unified in their training and techniques. Some teachers treat their Iron Palm methodology as a valuable secret, and only share their specific techniques, training methods, and herbal remedies with a select few.

Not all Iron Palm methods are a martial arts style unto itself, but rather form a special feature of specialized conditioning that appears in many schools of Chinese martial arts. Some non-Chinese martial arts styles, such as Muay Thai and many schools of Karate, also feature hand conditioning, but the term Iron Palm is not typically used to describe these types of training, as they tend not to focus on developing internal power when conditioning the hands for the bone-crushing forces encountered with the striking maneuvers evident in breaking normally "unbreakable" objects.

General principles

Iron Palm training often involves three primary components:

 Strengthening of the striking limbs by developing the tendons and ligaments from the shoulders to the fingertips, then striking or slapping relatively hard objects enclosed in canvas/leather bags. Following a conditioning session, the striking area is usually treated with a medicinal aid created from plant derivatives, usually a traditional Chinese liniment called Dit Da Jow. A common belief among practitioners is that failing to apply Dit Da Jow after Iron Palm training sessions can have negative effects on long-term health, such as movement limitation, arthritis, and other nerve damage to the hands. It is also believed that small blood clots can also occur if good Dit Da Jow is not used causing eye blindness through clots in small capillaries (blood vessels). Soaking and thorough massaging of hands after training is imperative.
 Using proper technique to strike with greater force: As in other martial arts, students learn specific body mechanics with the intent to produce a more powerful strike. Students train to relax the body and release residual tension in order to move faster. This is usually done with standing meditation routines designed to release the residual tension in the body and develop "linking" power. 
 Engaging in Qigong exercises in order to develop "qi" (also chi or ch'i, or Japanese ki). This Qigong training coordinates breathing to improve mental focus, resulting in a more powerful strike.

Direct and indirect methods

Schools of Iron Palm training are often divided into "direct" or "indirect." Both methods usually consist of striking progressively harder surfaces. Some practitioners also refer to their training as Nei Jing ("internal") or Li ("external"), this deals with the Qi energy or type of force (jin) used. In the "direct" method the hands are thrust into buckets or containers of the medium; the hands come into direct contact with the substance. In the "indirect" method, the practitioner strikes bags or other containers filled with various materials.  As training progresses, the bags or buckets filled with increasingly resistant substances starting with beans then sand, progressing onto gravel or rocks, then finally lead and iron shot. Practitioners can measure their progress based upon the number of strikes performed in a particular training session or by the amount of clock time spent training. Relaxation while training strikes and use of good Dit Da Jow medicine is imperative to proper success. Proper breathing is also essential for maximum effect/success.

Uses
The Chinese martial arts can utilize a wide variety of open and closed hand strikes.  Hardening the hands is also considered by some to supplement speed and strength lost through aging.  Iron palm practitioners often demonstrate their abilities by breaking hard objects such as bricks, coconuts, stones and boards with their bare hands or in some cases forcefully hitting a steel object rapidly without sustaining significant injury.

Techniques

Iron Palm—also called Tie Zhang in Chinese—utilizes five different striking techniques, they are as follows.
 Slapping - utilizes the whole palm
 Throwing - utilizes the back of the hand
 Cutting - utilizes the side of the palm
 Dotting - utilizes the fingertips
 Stamping - utilizes the base of the palm
These techniques are used when striking the Iron Palm bag which is filled with a variety of materials like, rice, mung beans, pea gravel or steel shot depending on one's level of expertise.
Before and after each training session, an Iron Palm liniment is applied to the hands to prevent injury and condition the hands. Tie Ba Zhang Yao is a popular liniment used for Iron Palm training and conditioning.

See also
Ku Yu Cheung
James Yimm Lee
Iron Shirt
Dim Mak

References

External links

Jin Jing Zhong (1934, trans. 2004). Authentic Shaolin Heritage: Training Methods of 72 Arts of Shaolin. Kungfulibrary.com 
Iron Palm demonstration
Iron Palm Training - Information about Iron Palm techniques, training, and theory
(Wayback Machine copy)
Iron Palm Training - what is it and why do it Comprehensive blog article on different Iron Palm methods
Chinese martial arts terminology
Strikes (martial arts)